Aikido concepts are ideas that form the philosophical or technical basis of the Japanese martial art aikido.

Aiki

 means the defender blends without clashing with the attacker, then goes on to dominate the assailant through the application of internal strength or Ki energy to effect techniques. Blending with an attacker's movements allows the Aiki practitioner to control the actions of the attacker with minimal effort.

Hanmi
 describes the idea that the sides of the body work as a unit (for example: left hand and left foot forward).  Usually, though not exclusively, descriptive of the movement in Aikido.  Closely related to the development of Chushin-ryoku.

Often used to refer to the triangular stance (kamae) of Aikido. Similar stances and the same word are used in other martial arts and traditional theater, including sumo and kyōgen.

Chūshin-ryoku 
.

Chūshin-sen 
. The term is also associated with kendo.

Ichi-go ichi-e

 describes a cultural concept often linked with tea master Sen no Rikyū. The term is often translated as "for this time only", "never again", or "one chance in a lifetime". Ichi-go ichi-e is linked with Zen Buddhism and concepts of transience. The term is particularly associated with the Japanese tea ceremony, and is often brushed onto scrolls which are hung in the tea room. In the context of tea ceremony, ichi-go ichi-e reminds participants that each tea meeting is unique.

Irimi

 describes entering straight into a technique, as opposed to the more indirect entrance into technique called tenkan. Irimi usually looks like a step forward, straight or at an angle but usually ending with the body facing the attacker, rather than in the direction of the step. To enter with irimi, the defender needs to move in the very moment of the attack or even himself initiate it.

Katsu hayabi 
 is a highly developed state in which an aikido practitioner has reached spiritual and moral perfection, and becomes immune to violence. "Victory" occurs at the speed of light -- meaning instantaneous—because an opponent cannot even begin an attack.

speed of light is much slower than "instantaneous"...

Kokyū-Ryoku
 Is the concept of relaxed power generated from the tanden.  There is an implication in the word kokyū that this type of power does not clash with uke.

Kuzushi

 is the Japanese term for unbalancing an opponent in the martial arts. The noun comes from the intransitive verb, kuzusu, meaning to level, pull down, or demolish. As such, it refers to not just an unbalancing, but the process of getting an opponent into a position where his stability, and hence ability to regain compromised balance, is destroyed.

Maai

 refers to the space between two opponents in combat. It is a complex concept, incorporating not just the distance between opponents, but also the time it will take to cross the distance, angle and rhythm of attack. It is specifically the exact position from which one opponent can strike the other, after factoring in the above elements. For example, a faster opponent's maai is farther away than a slower opponent. It is ideal for one opponent to maintain maai while preventing the other from doing so.

Masakatsu agatsu
 is a 4 character compound expressing a concept in Japanese martial arts, particularly aikido, referring to the true victory of self-mastery. It was a common saying of aikido founder Morihei Ueshiba which emphasizes that aikido is not a competitive martial art like judo or taekwondo.

Shinmu fusatsu
 states that in aikido one should not kill the opponent. It is related to the kenjutsu concepts of satsuninto (殺人刀 the sword that takes life; also satsujinken 殺人剣) and katsujinken (活人剣 the sword that gives life).

Taisabaki

 relates to 'whole body movement', or repositioning. It can be translated as body-management. It is a term used widely in kendo, jujutsu, aikido, judo, karate and ninjutsu. Tai sabaki is usually used to avoid an attack, such that the receiver of the attack ends up in an advantageous position and it is often wrongly referred to as "evasion."

Takemusu
 was the concept developed by Morihei Ueshiba of how the ultimate martial art should be, how his aikido should be, an art which may harmonize all living beings and free techniques could be spontaneously executed.

In his latest years, Ueshiba developed the more spiritual aspects of his art and even adopted the name Takemusu Tsunemori, under which he left many paintings and poems.

Tenkan

 is a 180-degree pivot to one's rear, on the lead foot.

Zanshin

 refers to a state of awareness – of relaxed alertness. The literal translation of zanshin is "remaining mind". Zanshin sometimes refers more narrowly to the body's posture after a technique is executed.

Yamabiko

The concept of calling out the attack rather than waiting for the attacker.  The term presumably comes from a poem by the founder. 

References 

Aikido